"No No Song" is a 1974 song by English musician Ringo Starr. Written by Hoyt Axton and David Jackson, it appeared on Starr's 1974 album, Goodnight Vienna. It was released as a single in the US on 27 January 1975, backed with "Snookeroo," and reached No. 1 in Canada, #3 in the Billboard charts, becoming his 7th and last top 10 hit. It also reached No. 1 on Cash Box charts in the US.

In the song, the narrator meets a woman from Colombia who offers him marijuana; a woman from Mallorca, Spain who offers him cocaine; and a man from Nashville, Tennessee who offers him moonshine whiskey. The narrator declines all of them, saying that they are bad for his health. Harry Nilsson provides backing vocals.

Some reissues and later pressings of the Ringo Starr version credit the song as "No No Song/Skokiaan." This is presumably due to a copyright claim by the publishers of the latter song, although details are lacking. There are some similarities between parts of "Skokiaan" and the instrumental break between the second and third verses of Starr's version of the "No No Song," but without documentation this is no more than a supposition.

Reception
Billboard described "No No Song" as a "good, fun Ringo cut."  Billboard expressed concern that the drug references might limit airplay, even though the lyrics have the singer rejecting drug use.  Cash Box described it as a "friendly, tongue-in-cheek temperance tune," saying that "Ringo delivers it like he really means it!!"

Covers 
In 1975, the song's writer, Hoyt Axton, released his own version of the song, featuring Cheech and Chong, on his album Southbound.

That same year, Joe Dassin released a French language adaptation of the song, "" ("Me, I Said No"), as the B-side of his most successful single, "". In this version, the protagonist refuses money, a marriage proposal and a political office in order to preserve his peace of mind. Another French version, "", ("I'm a Faithful Husband") was also released in 1975 by Robert Demontigny for the Québec market in Canada. This time, the protagonist refuses various women's advances but changes his mind in the end when he finds his wife kissing his best friend.

Brazilian rock musician Raul Seixas recorded a Brazilian Portuguese version called "" ("Don't Want to Ride on the Wrong Way Anymore"), adapting the drugs mentioned in the lyrics to the Brazilian culture (respectively, Colombian marijuana, Bolivian cocaine and Argentinian chloroethane spray). This version was included on his 1988 album  ("The Genesis's Stone") and issued as a promotional single.

Chart history

Weekly charts

Year-end charts

References
 Footnotes

 Citations

External links
 

Ringo Starr songs
Apple Records singles
1975 singles
Songs written by Hoyt Axton
Song recordings produced by Richard Perry
Songs about drugs
Songs about cannabis
Songs about cocaine
Songs about alcohol
1974 songs
Cashbox number-one singles
RPM Top Singles number-one singles